Birds described in 1868 include Antillean siskin, Yap monarch, saffron-crested tyrant-manakin, chestnut-headed crake,
Alfred Newton proposes protection for seabirds
Death of Magnus von Wright.
August von Pelzeln publishes volume 1 of Zur Ornithologie Brasiliens; Resultate von Johann Natterers Reisen in den Jahren 1817 bis 1835.Wien, A. Pichler's Witwe & Sohne, 1868–70.
Édouard Verreaux Catalogue des Oiseaux disponibles dans la maison d'E. Verreaux, 1868 – Catalog of birds found in the house of E. Verreaux
Bernard Altum Der Vogel und sein Leben, Münster 1868 (Birds and their lives); published in several editions, 7th edition 1903.

Expeditions
1865–1868 Magenta circumnavigation of the globe  Italian expedition that made important scientific observations in South America. 
Ongoing events
John Gould The birds of Australia Supplement 1851–69. 1 vol. 81 plates; Artists: J. Gould and H. C. Richter; Lithographer: H. C. Richter
John Gould The birds of Asia 1850-83 7 vols. 530 plates, Artists: J. Gould, H. C. Richter, W. Hart and J. Wolf; Lithographers:H. C. Richter and W. Hart
The Ibis

References

Bird
Birding and ornithology by year